Avenida Norte-Quito-Sur or NQS is an arterial road in Bogotá, Colombia that crosses the city from northeast to southwest. The avenue is formed from the union of three old avenues, Avenida Ciudad de Quito, Avenida Novena, and Autopista Sur.

Etymology 
The complete name of the road, from its end on Calle 170 until the entrance to the municipality of Soacha is Avenida Norte-Quito-Sur. Along the route of these three roads, it also is known by four other names: Avenida Carrera Novena, Carrera 30, Avenida Calle 57 Sur, and Troncal NQS.

Route 

NQS is divided into three distinct stretches, with three different names:

 Avenida Novena runs through the Usaquén neighborhood in north Bogotá from north to south, parallel to the railway that joins Bogotá with the Sabana Central and Boyacá, from Calle 153. This route was lengthened to join with Carrera 30 at Calle 92, forming the northerly stretch of NQS
 Avenida Ciudad de Quito, also called Carrera 30, runs north to south between Calle 92 and Calle 50 South; the southerly part is not considered part of NQS
 Autopista Sur, which parts from Avenida Ciudad de Quito at Calle 3a Sur, constituting the principal route leaving Bogotá by the southwest. It then joins the municipality of Soacha and leads to cities such as Ibagué, Armenia, and Cali. 

Avenida Novena is widened in 2009 between Calle 153 and 170. From there, there have been studies regarding an extension to Chia.

Points of interest along the route 

 The Instituto Pedagógico Nacional
 The Fundación Santa Fe de Bogotá (hospital)
 Santa Ana shopping center
 The Usaquén train station
 El Bosque University
 El Bosque clinic
 Estadio El Campín
 Movistar Arena
 The National University of Colombia
 The CAD (Centro Administrativo Distrital)
 San Pedro Claver clinic
 DAS (Departamento Administrativo de Seguridad) headquarters
 General Santander police school
 The La Sevillana factory
 The station Portal del Sur, part of the TransMilenio mass-transit system

References

External links 

Streets in Bogotá